This article present the squads for the 2015 African U-20 Championship. Only players born on or after 1 January 1995 are eligible to play.

Congo
Head coach:  Paolo Berrettini

Ghana

Head coach:  Sellas Tetteh

Ivory Coast

Head coach:  Ibrahim Kamara

Mali
Head coach:  Fagnéry Diarra

Nigeria

Head coach:  Manu Garba

Senegal

Head coach:  Joseph Koto

South Africa

Head coach:  Thabo Senong

Zambia

Head coach:  Hector Chilombo

Notes

References

Squads
Africa U-20 Cup of Nations squads